Liu Ye (170s - 234), courtesy name Ziyang, was an adviser to the warlord Cao Cao during the late Eastern Han dynasty of China. After the fall of the Eastern Han dynasty, he served as an official in the state of Cao Wei during the Three Kingdoms period, serving under Cao Pi and Cao Rui. He was a member of the House of Liu, the imperial clan of the Han dynasty, and a direct descendant of Emperor Guangwu, via Guangwu's seventh son Liu Yan. He had two sons: Liu Yu and Liu Tao.

Early life
	
Liu's mother died when he was six. On her deathbed, she told him and his brother Liu Huan to kill a dangerous and treacherous servant belonging to his father Liu Pu once they were older. Liu killed the servant six years later. Liu Pu was angry and asked his son the reason for the murder. Liu Ye replied that he was just following his mother's last wish and was ready to take punishment. After hearing the explanation, Liu Pu had a change of heart, and forgave Ye.

While Xu Shao was at Yangzhou, he praised Liu Ye as someone with the ability to help a sovereign govern his realm. 

Due to his family background and act of killing the servant, Liu already had a great reputation when he was in his early twenties. During this time, some local rich landowners had formed their own private armies. Among them, Zheng Bao (郑宝) was the strongest and he wanted to force people living in Huainan to move to another prefecture. Zheng wanted to take advantage of Liu's reputation to assist with the eviction; Liu Ye was unwilling to do so. Around this period, an emissary from Cao Cao came to visit Liu Ye to discuss current state of affairs; Liu Ye persuaded the emissary to stay with him for a few days. Zheng Bao wanted to meet Cao Cao's emissary, so he went to Liu's home with hundreds of soldiers, bringing along cows and wine. Liu Ye then entertained Zheng with a feast. During the feast, he killed Zheng during a toast and threatened the now-leaderless soldiers to withdraw by claiming that by Cao Cao's orders, anyone who attacked would be guilty of the same offences as Zheng. After the feast, Liu went to Zheng Bao's military camp with several servants. At the camp, Liu persuaded Zheng's private army to surrender by analysing the situation for the soldiers. Liu Ye felt that as a member of the imperial Liu clan, he should not have his own army as the Han dynasty was by then floundering; he then gave these thousands of surrendered soldiers to the local governor, Liu Xun (刘勋). After this incident, Liu Ye became a counselor serving under Liu Xun.

Liu Ye could be the "Liu Ziyang" mentioned in Lu Su's biography in Sanguozhi, who was a friend of Lu and wrote a letter to him, asking him to join Zheng Bao.

Serving Liu Xun
While Liu Ye was serving under Liu Xun, Sun Ce invited Liu Xun to attack Shangliao City (上缭城); Sun sent Liu Xun gifts and Sun's emissary was overly humble. Liu Ye advised Liu Xun not to attack Shangliao, but Liu Xun did not listen. During the attack on Shangliao, Sun Ce attacked Liu Xun. The defeated Liu Xun then decided to join Cao Cao, and Liu Ye followed suit.

Serving Cao Cao
Before Wei Feng's rebellion, he had an excellent reputation, and many middle- and low- ranking officials were close friends of Wei. However, Liu Ye, upon seeing Wei for the first time, claimed that Wei will eventually rebel.

Serving Cao Pi
In 220, not long after Cao Pi crowned himself emperor, Meng Da defected to Wei and brought with him 4000 soldiers. Meng Da received various important appointments and the title of a marquis. In addition, Cao Pi merged the three commanderies of Fangling, Shangyong and Xicheng (西城) to form a larger commandery, Xincheng (新城), and he appointed Meng Da as the Administrator (太守) of Xincheng and tasked him with defending Wei's southwestern border. Liu Ye advised Cao Pi, "Meng Da is always looking out for rewards which are not rightfully his, and he is prone to schemes due to his talent. Thus, he will not be grateful to Your Excellency. Xincheng borders Sun Quan's and Liu Bei's territories. If the regional situation changes, it will create troubles for the realm."; Cao Pi ignored Liu.

Also in 220, Liu Ye was made Palace Attendant (侍中) and bestowed the peerage of a Secondary Marquis (關內侯). At that time, Cao Pi asked his court whether Liu Bei would avenge Guan Yu, who was killed during Sun Quan's attack on Jingzhou. Most of them opined that Shu was a small state and that Guan Yu was its only famous general. But Liu Ye thought that Liu Bei would definitely wage war to revive his prestige; he also believed that Liu Bei and Guan Yu had a very close relationship and so Liu would avenge Guan. In the end, Liu Bei did attack Sun Quan the following year. By then, Sun Quan was mobilising the power of the entire state of Wu to deal with the invasion, and he proclaimed himself a vassal to Cao Wei. Many officials congratulated Cao Pi, but Liu Ye believed that Sun Quan had no intention of submitting, and submitted himself as a vassal only as a last resort. Liu Ye even suggested that Cao Pi take advantage of the situation to lead troops to attack Wu to avoid future troubles. But Cao Pi disagreed.

When Zhang Liao fell ill while stationed at Yongqiu, Cao Pi sent Liu Ye, along with imperial physicians, to visit Zhang. Also, just before Cao Pi's death, he asked various officials, including Liu Ye, about Yang Fu. At the officials' recommendations, Cao Pi wanted to promote Yang, but died before he could do so.

Serving Cao Rui
Liu Ye's downfall came when Cao Rui was warned by someone that Liu was second-guessing him. Cao Rui decided to test this out; when he realised that Liu Ye was indeed pandering to him, he began to avoid Liu.

See also
 Lists of people of the Three Kingdoms

Notes

References

 Chen, Shou (3rd century). Records of the Three Kingdoms (Sanguozhi).
 Pei, Songzhi (5th century). Annotations to Records of the Three Kingdoms (Sanguozhi zhu).

Year of birth unknown
234 deaths
Officials under Cao Cao
Cao Wei politicians
Politicians from Lu'an
Han dynasty politicians from Anhui